Runa Pradhan (born December 5, 1984) is a Nepalese former swimmer, who specialized in sprint freestyle events. Pradhan competed for Nepal, as a 15-year-old teen, in the women's 50 m freestyle at the 2000 Summer Olympics in Sydney. She received a ticket from FINA, under a Universality program, in an entry time of 31.70. She challenged six other swimmers in heat two, including Cambodia's two-time Olympian Hem Raksmey and Maldives' 13-year-old Fariha Fathimath. She scorched the field to race for the third seed in 31.28, cutting off her lifetime best and a Nepalese record by 0.42 seconds. Pradhan failed to advance into the semifinals, as she placed sixty-sixth overall in the prelims.

References

External links
 

1984 births
Living people
Nepalese female swimmers
Olympic swimmers of Nepal
Swimmers at the 2000 Summer Olympics
Nepalese female freestyle swimmers
Sportspeople from Kathmandu
21st-century Nepalese women